Ascension of Our Lord Catholic Church is a historic church on FM 957 in Moravia, Texas.

It was built in 1912 and added to the National Register in 1983.

See also

National Register of Historic Places listings in Lavaca County, Texas

References

Roman Catholic churches in Texas
Churches on the National Register of Historic Places in Texas
Gothic Revival church buildings in Texas
Roman Catholic churches completed in 1912
Churches in Lavaca County, Texas
1912 establishments in Texas
National Register of Historic Places in Lavaca County, Texas
20th-century Roman Catholic church buildings in the United States